Tizayuca is one of the 84 municipalities of Hidalgo, in central-eastern Mexico. The city of Tizayuca is the municipal seat. The population of the city is 60,265 and the municipality has 168,302 inhabitants.

Geography
The municipality covers an area of 76.81 km². 

It is the only municipality in Hidalgo state that is officially part of the Mexico City Metropolitan Area, while the metro area of Pachuca surrounds the north and west limits.

As of 2005, the municipality had a total population of 56,573., but this has grown rapidly to reach 97,461 at the 2010 Census and to 168,302 at the 2020 Census.

History

Tizayuca was originally a Pre-Columbian Nahua settlement in the Valley of Mexico.

References

Municipalities of Hidalgo (state)
Mexico City metropolitan area
Nahua settlements
Populated places in Hidalgo (state)
Valley of Mexico